Schistophleps manusi is a moth in the subfamily Arctiinae. It was described by Rothschild in 1916. It is found on the Admiralty Islands.

References

Natural History Museum Lepidoptera generic names catalog

Moths described in 1916
Nudariina